Jack Regan (born 7 August 1995) is an Irish hurler who plays as a full-forward for the Meath senior team.

Born in Summerhill, County Meath, Regan first played competitive hurling at juvenile and underage levels with the Kiltale club. He eventually became a member of the club's senior team, and has won five county senior championship medals since 2012.

Regan made his debut on the inter-county scene at the age of sixteen when he was selected for the Meath minor team. After winning an All-Ireland medal in his debut year, he had two further championship seasons with the minor team. Regan subsequently joined the Meath under-21 team, winning an All-Ireland medal as captain in 2016. By this stage he had also joined the Meath senior team, making his debut during the 2014 league.

Honours

 Kiltale
 Meath Senior Hurling Championship: 2012, 2014, 2015, 2016, 2017

 Meath
 All-Ireland Under-21 B Hurling Championship: 2016 (c)
 All-Ireland Minor B Hurling Championship: 2011

References

1995 births
Living people
Kiltale hurlers
Meath inter-county hurlers